Kno or KNO may refer to:
 Kno, an American education software company
 Collagen, type XVIII, alpha 1, a protein
 Kno (musician) (Ryan Wisler), member of the hip hop trio CunninLynguists
 Knockhill Racing Circuit, Fife, Scotland
 Korea National Opera
 Commander of the Order of the Polar Star
 Kualanamu International Airport, an IATA code serving in Medan, Indonesia